Jan Stejskal (born 15 January 1962) is a Czech football goalkeeping coach and former player. In a 17-year playing career, he set a Czechoslovak First League record for clean sheets in a season, and spent four years in England at Queens Park Rangers. Stejskal played for Czechoslovakia and later the Czech Republic, for both he played a total of 31 matches, participating in the 1990 FIFA World Cup. Stejskal is now the Mayor of a town in the Czech Republic' Jevany.

Playing career
In his native country Stejskal played for Sparta Prague, where he equalled the league record of 19 clean sheets in a season, in the 1986–87 season.

He moved to England, where he had a successful spell at Queens Park Rangers from 1990 to 1994. He was one of only 13 foreign players to play on the opening weekend of the FA Premier League along with Peter Schmeichel, Andrei Kanchelskis, Robert Warzycha, Roland Nilsson, Eric Cantona, Hans Segers, John Faxe Jensen, Anders Limpar, Gunnar Halle, Craig Forrest, Michel Vonk and Ronnie Rosenthal. Stejskal was a very tall commanding goalkeeper with a sound trade, but his language problem let him down from time to time.

After returning to the Czech Republic, Stejskal played for Slavia Prague and Viktoria Žižkov before retiring in 1999.

Coaching career
After ending his playing career, Stejskal worked as a goalkeeping coach for both Sparta Prague and the Czech Republic national football team. In December 2011, he left Sparta, where he was replaced in his role by former national team goalkeeper Pavel Srníček.

Stejskal was the goalkeeping coach for the Czech Republic at UEFA Euro 2012. Stejskal joined FK Jablonec as a goalkeeping coach in the summer of 2012.

Stejskal is also a qualified mechanic, a trade learned whilst serving on national duty for the former Czechoslovakia.

References

External links
 

1962 births
Living people
Footballers from Brno
Czech footballers
Czech Republic international footballers
Czechoslovak footballers
Association football goalkeepers
Premier League players
Czech First League players
FK Hvězda Cheb players
Queens Park Rangers F.C. players
1990 FIFA World Cup players
Czechoslovakia international footballers
Dual internationalists (football)
AC Sparta Prague players
FK Viktoria Žižkov players
SK Slavia Prague players
Expatriate footballers in England
Czech expatriate footballers
Czechoslovak expatriate footballers
Czech expatriate sportspeople in England
Czechoslovak expatriate sportspeople in England